Radnorshire was created in 1542 as a constituency of the House of Commons of the Parliament of England then of the Parliament of Great Britain from 1707 to 1800 and of the Parliament of the United Kingdom from 1801 to 1918. It elected one knight of the shire (MP) by the first past the post system.

By 1918, having too small a relative population the area was combined with that of Breconshire to form Brecon and Radnor constituency.

Members of Parliament

MPs 1542–1604

MPs 1604–1918

Election results

Elections in the 1830s

Elections in the 1840s
Wilkins' death caused a by-election.

Elections in the 1850s

Elections in the 1860s

Walsh was elevated to the peerage, becoming 1st Baron Ormathwaite and causing a by-election.

Elections in the 1870s

Elections in the 1880s

Elections in the 1890s

Elections in the 1900s

Elections in the 1910s

General Election 1914–15:

Another General Election was required to take place before the end of 1915. The political parties had been making preparations for an election to take place and by the July 1914, the following candidates had been selected; 
Liberal: William Lewis
Unionist: Herbert Clark Lewis, 2nd Baron Merthyr|Herbert Clark Lewis

References

 D Brunton & D H Pennington, Members of the Long Parliament (London: George Allen & Unwin, 1954)
 Cobbett's Parliamentary history of England, from the Norman Conquest in 1066 to the year 1803 (London: Thomas Hansard, 1808) 
 The Constitutional Year Book for 1913 (London: National Union of Conservative and Unionist Associations, 1913)
 F W S Craig, British Parliamentary Election Results 1832-1885 (2nd edition, Aldershot: Parliamentary Research Services, 1989)
 J E Neale, The Elizabethan House of Commons (London: Jonathan Cape, 1949)
 W R Williams The Parliamentary History of the Principality of Wales 
 

Radnorshire
Historic parliamentary constituencies in Mid Wales
Constituencies of the Parliament of the United Kingdom established in 1542
Constituencies of the Parliament of the United Kingdom disestablished in 1918
1542 establishments in Wales
1918 disestablishments in Wales